Le President a-t-il Le Sida is a 2006 Haitian movie directed by Haitian Filmmaker Arnold Antonin starring Jimmy Jean-Louis (of Heroes) and Jessica Généus. It tells the story of Dao, a prominent musician who leads an unprotected sexual life with orgies and drug use. He changes his lifestyle when he meets Nina, a poor 23-year-old. Dao ends up in the hospital after a car accident. He later finds out that he has contracted AIDS. His mother takes him to a voodoo priest in hopes that the "evil spirits" will be removed. Nina marries him 6 months after finding out that he has AIDS.

Casting 
 Ricardo Lefèvre
 Manfred Marcelin
 Chantal Pierre-Louis
 Réginald Lubin
 Nadège Telfort

This movie is rated PG-13 and lasts for 1 hour and 50 minutes.
It is subtitled in English, Spanish, and French.

Awards
 2006: FESPACO Special Award Of the Committee of Struggle against aids of Burkina Faso Does the Président have AIDS?
 2006: Festival Vues d'Afrique de Montreal Mention speciale du Jury Does the Président have AIDS?
 2007: FESPACO Paul Robeson prize for Does the President Have Aids?

External links 

 
Arnold Antonin Films Does the President Have Aids?

Haitian Creole-language films
Haitian drama films
HIV/AIDS in film
2006 films